Mark Graham may refer to:

Mark Anthony Graham (1973–2006), Canadian Olympic athlete and casualty in the War in Afghanistan
Mark Graham (rugby league) (born 1955), New Zealand rugby league footballer and coach
Mark Graham (Australian footballer) (born 1973), former Australian rules footballer
Mark Graham (footballer, born 1974), Northern Irish footballer for Cambridge United and Queens Park Rangers
Mark Graham (diver), New Zealand diver